Caln Township is a township in Chester County, Pennsylvania, United States. The population was 14,428 at the 2020 census. The township was founded by settlers from Calne, Wiltshire in England in 1714. The relationship with Calne, Wiltshire, continues today as the two towns are sister cities. Caln is a Township of the First Class. The governing body is a Board of Commissioners. The Board President is President Paul Mullin, Vice President Jane Kennedy, Board Members Joshua Young, Lorraine Tindaro and Mark Evans. The Township Manager is Kristen Denne. There are 53 employees, including 20 police officers, that work for Caln Township.

Atop of a hill overlooking Coatesville and located in Caln, the historic Coatesville VA Medical Center (a major Veterans Administration hospital) provides care to approximately 20,000 veterans in the region annually. Brandywine Hospital, which resided in Caln Township, was abruptly closed in January 2022 by West Reading-based Tower Health after systemwide financial difficulties. The hospital primarily served northwestern Chester County.

Caln Township is part of Coatesville Area School District (CASD). The western end of the township along U.S. Business 30 is sometimes referred to as the Village of Caln. Historically, there were places referred to as Reeceville (northwestern corner), Ingleside (between Caln and Thorndale), Bondsville (north of Thorndale), and Galagherville (between Thorndale and Downingtown) within the township. The names of these communities have since fallen out of usage except for local road names and CASD’s Reeceville Elementary School.

History
The Caln Meeting House was listed on the National Register of Historic Places in 1984. Carver Court, a historically African American housing development built in 1944, was listed on the National Register of Historic Places in 2016.

Geography

Adjacent townships
Valley Township (northwest)
West Brandywine Township (northwest)
East Brandywine Township (north)
East Caln Township (northeast)
West Bradford Township (south)
East Fallowfield Township (southwest)

The city of Coatesville is on the west side of the township. The borough of Downingtown is on the east side of the township; both are politically independent.

Demographics

At the 2010 census, the township was 72.8% non-Hispanic White, 16.2% Black or African American, 0.1% Native American, 3.9% Asian, 0.1% Native Hawaiian or other Pacific Islander, and 2.2% were two or more races. 5.5% of the population were of Hispanic or Latino ancestry.

At the 2000 census, there were 11,916 people, 4,363 households and 3,067 families residing in the township. The racial make-up was 78.78% White, 15.76% African American, 0.19% Native American, 2.44% Asian, 0.05% Pacific Islander, 1.19% from other races and 1.59% from two or more races. Hispanic or Latino of any race were 3.24% of the population.

There were 4,363 households, of which 35.7% had children under the age of 18 living with them, 54.4% were married couples living together, 11.4% had a female householder with no husband present, and 29.7% were non-families. 22.9% of all households were made up of individuals, and 6.4% had someone living alone who was 65 years of age or older. The average household size was 2.60 and the average family size was 3.10.

25.5% (of the population were under the age of 18, 6.5% from 18 to 24, 35.0% from 25 to 44, 21.9% from 45 to 64, and 11.0% were 65 years of age or older. The median age was 36 years. For every 100 females there were 102.5 males. For every 100 females age 18 and over, there were 103.3 males.

The median household income was $60,198 and the median family income was $65,520. Males had a median income of $43,169 and females $33,193. The per capita income was $25,494. About 3.6% of families and 5.0% of the population were below the poverty line, including 6.6% of those under age 18 and 8.0% of those age 65 or over.

Transportation

U.S. Route 30 is the main highway serving Caln Township. It follows the Coatesville-Downingtown Bypass along a southwest-northeast alignment across the northern and northwestern portions of the township. U.S. Route 30 Business follows the old alignment of US 30 along Lincoln Highway through southern and southeastern portions of the township. U.S. Route 322 follows Horseshoe Pike along a northwest-southeast alignment across the northeastern corner of the township. Pennsylvania Route 282 follows Creek Road across the northeastern corner of the township. Finally, Pennsylvania Route 340 follows Bondsville Road and Kings Highway along a generally east-west alignment from US 30 Business westward across central and western parts of the township.

Thorndale, a commercial center within the township, has a SEPTA train station that provides rail service to Philadelphia.

Education
Coatesville Area School District is the area school district. Caln Elementary School and Coatesville Area High School are in the township.

Downingtown Middle School of the Downingtown Area School District (DASD) is physically in Caln Township, as is a part of Downingtown High School West. DASD does not serve Caln Township.

References

External links

 Township website

Townships in Chester County, Pennsylvania
1714 establishments in Pennsylvania